Mesovouni may refer to several places in Greece:
, a village in the municipal unit Central Zagori, Ioannina regional unit
Mesovouni, Karditsa, a village in the municipal unit Argithea, Karditsa regional unit
, a village in the municipal unit Margariti, Thesprotia